The 2023 GT World Challenge Europe Endurance Cup will be the thirteenth season of the GT World Challenge Europe Endurance Cup since its inception in 2011 as the Blancpain Endurance Series. The season will begin on 22 April at Autodromo Nazionale Monza and end on 1 October at Circuit de Barcelona-Catalunya.

Calendar
The provisional calendar was released on July 29, 2022 at the SRO's annual 24 Hours of Spa press conference, featuring five rounds. In a change from the 2022 schedule, the opening round at Imola was moved back to Monza. The calendar was further adjusted to alleviate a conflict between the Belgian Grand Prix and the 24 Hours of Spa. The 24-hour event was moved forward to the weekend of 1–2 July, while the Monza round was moved forward one week, and Nürburgring returned to the calendar.

Entry list

Race results
Bold indicates the overall winner.

See also
 2023 British GT Championship
 2023 GT World Challenge Europe
 2023 GT World Challenge Europe Sprint Cup
 2023 GT World Challenge Asia
 2023 GT World Challenge America
 2023 GT World Challenge Australia
 2023 Intercontinental GT Challenge

Notes

References

External links
 

GT World Challenge Europe Endurance Cup
GT World Challenge Europe Endurance Cup
GT World Challenge Europe Endurance Cup